The 1979–80 Virginia Tech Hokies men's basketball team represented Virginia Polytechnic Institute and State University from Blacksburg, Virginia as members of the Metro Conference during the 1979–80 season. The Hokies were led by head coach Charles Moir and played their home games at Cassell Coliseum in Blacksburg, Virginia. After finishing second in the Metro regular season standings, Virginia Tech lost in the quarterfinal round of the conference tournament but did secure a bid to the NCAA tournament. As No. 7 seed in the Mideast region, the team beat No. 10 seed Western Kentucky in the opening round before losing to Indiana.

Roster

Schedule and results

|-
!colspan=9 style=| Regular Season

|-
!colspan=9 style=| Metro Tournament

|-
!colspan=9 style=| NCAA Tournament

Rankings

References

Virginia Tech Hokies men's basketball seasons
Virginia Tech
Virginia Tech
1979 in sports in Virginia
1980 in sports in Virginia